William Lansdowne may refer to:

Association football
William Lansdowne, Sr., better known as Bill Lansdowne, English former professional footballer who played for West Ham United
William Lansdowne, Jr., better known as Billy Lansdowne, English former professional footballer who played for West Ham United, Charlton Athletic, Gillingham and Kalmar

Other
William Petty, 2nd Earl of Shelburne and 1st Marquess of Lansdowne, British Prime Minister between 1782 and 1783.
William Lansdowne Beale, High Sheriff of Berkshire in 1893
William Lansdowne, former Police Chief of the San Diego Police Department (California)